Batchelors is a popular brand of predominantly dried food products. The Bachelors company was founded in 1895 in Sheffield, England by William Batchelor, initially specialising in canned vegetables. It released its first dried soup in 1949, and it started selling its convenience Cup-a-Soup range in 1972. The company now makes pasta and rice dishes like "Pasta 'n' Sauce" and "Super Rice" along with instant soup, in particular Cup-a-Soup and noodle products such as Super Noodles. The company is the UK market leader in dried soups.

Since early 2008, the Batchelors name has also been applied to Premier Foods' condensed soup range, previously sold as Campbell's. The Campbell's brand returned to the UK in 2011, after a five-year non-compete agreement expired.

History
William Batchelor was born in Habrough, Lincolnshire, in 1860 to  Ellen, née Hudson, and James Batchelor, a farmworker who later had his own farm. William discovered a way to can vegetables such as processed peas and formed Batchelors Foods in 1895. He died in August 1913 whilst on holiday in Bridlington. He was 53. His daughter Ella (who became Ella Gasking), aged 22, took over leadership of the company and developed it to include processed peas, with Batchelors eventually becoming a household name.

Ella Hudson Gasking (1891–1966) often known as Mrs. E. H. Gasking, took over the family business of Batchelor's Peas, opening a new factory at Wadsley Bridge Sheffield in 1937 costing £100,000 to build. It was the largest canning plant in Britain, covering 12 acres including playing fields & speaker radios for staff. In 1943 Mrs Gasking was awarded OBE in recognition of her contribution to war effort & grocery industry.

Due to staff difficulties and rationing in the war, the company was bought by James Van den Bergh of Unilever in 1943, where it became part of Van den Bergh Foods (later based in Crawley). In 1948, Ella Gasking retired and her younger brother Maurice Batchelor took over. The company took over Poulton and Noel, another soup company. In 1949, the first dried soup, chicken noodle flavour, was sold. In 1972, Cup-a-Soup was launched.

In January 2001, Unilever took over Bestfoods. To be allowed to take over the American company, Unilever had to sell off some brands for monopoly regulation. It sold off Batchelors and Oxo to the UK subsidiary of the Campbell Soup Company.

Unilever retained ownership of the Cup-a-Soup brand in America and Australia, rebranding them under Lipton and Continental respectively.

In 2006, Campbell's soup withdrew from the UK market, and sold its assets, including Batchelors, to Premier Foods.  The Campbell's name was licensed to Premier Foods until 2008, following which Campbell's Soup was rebranded as Batchelors.

In 2008, Batchelors was rebranded with a new logo.

References

External links
 Batchelor's Homepage
 Ciao Review of Cup A Soup
 Cup A Soup at SnackSpot.
 Cup A Soup TV Advert.
 PDF file with Batchelors history.
 Campbell Soup UK.
 Super Noodles.

Food manufacturers of the United Kingdom
Batchelor's
Batchelor's
Food and drink companies established in 1895
Manufacturing companies based in Sheffield
1895 establishments in England